The Manggarai–Padalarang railway is a railway line in Indonesia from Manggarai railway station in South Jakarta to Padalarang railway station in West Bandung Regency.

History
In 2001, an earthquake destroyed the Lampegan Tunnel, which the line passed through.
In November 2012, a landslide hit the line near Cilebut.

Passenger service between Cianjur and Padalarang ceased in 2013. Service was restored between Cianjur and Ciranjang in 2019. Passenger service between Ciranjang and Cipatat restarted on 21 September 2020.

References

External links

Railway lines in Indonesia